An evolutionary attractor is a state toward which evolution tends. Most often it means that adaptation is moving a population of a species towards a particular goal  that goal is the attractor. It less commonly means any other outcome of evolution and/or a larger group than one population.

Attractors are important to evolutionary epidemiology because what goal a pathogen is pursuing  and its speed of progress towards more transmissible and/or more virulent attractors  radically alter the actual damage a pathogen will do. It also shapes the course of a species invasion.

References 

Evolutionary theory